Pietraporzio is a comune (municipality) in the Province of Cuneo in the Italian region Piedmont, located in the Valle Stura about  southwest of Turin and about  west of Cuneo, on the border with France.

Pietraporzio borders the following municipalities: Argentera, Canosio, Saint-Etienne-de-Tinée (France), Sambuco, and Vinadio.

References

Cities and towns in Piedmont